Carabus granulatus is a species of beetle. It is found across the Palearctic from Ireland  to the Russian Far East and has been introduced to North America.It is widespread in Europe. C.  granulatus lives in fields, prairies, taiga and in forests. Also along river margins, in fens, lakeshores, and upland peat. It is occasional in gardens.

Description
[[Image:Carabus granulatus Linné, 1758 (2884924385).jpg|thumb|left|230px| Photo showing the "chain links]]
It is a small Carabus (length between 14 and 20 mm), winged and characterized by an elongated body which is  not very convex and an enlarged thorax. The antennae and the legs are black, the upper part of the animal shiny, predominantly greenish  bronze, green or occasionally black. The elytra are subparallel with "chain link" (longitudinal grooves with granules).

BiologyCarabus  granulatus'' is one of the very few species of ground beetles that have not completely lost their ability to fly, only the mountain forms are short-winged.  Nevertheless, the nocturnal animals generally remain on the ground, where they prey on insects, worms and snails. During the day they hide under tree trunks or stones. From autumn to spring, the animals often spend the winter together in tree stumps. The females lay about forty eggs. The larvae moult three times before pupating in the ground. The adult  beetles hatch in autumn.

External links
Carabus (Carabus) granulatus Linnaeus, 1758 (Carabidae) - atlas of beetles of Russia

granulatus
Beetles of Europe
Beetles described in 1758
Taxa named by Carl Linnaeus